Michurinets is a railway station of Kiyevsky suburban railway line in Vnukovskoye Settlement of Moscow. It was opened in 1949 and was rebuilt in 2020. The station is named after nearly located dacha cooperative, which name is commemorating Russian botanist Ivan Michurin.

Gallery

References

Railway stations in Moscow Oblast
Railway stations of Moscow Railway
Railway stations in Russia opened in 1949